Sunan al-Darimi or Musnad al-Darimi by `Abd Allah ibn `Abd al-Rahman al-Darimi (181H–255H) is a hadith collection considered by  Sunnis to be among the prominent nine collections: the Al-Kutub al-Sittah, Al-Muwatta and the Musnad of Imam Ahmad.

Despite its title as a Musnad, it is not arranged by narrator in the manner of other Musnads, such as that of Tayalisi or Ibn Hanbal. It is arranged by subject matter in the manner of a book of Sunan, like the Sunan Ibn Majah.

Description
It contain almost three thousand five hundred hadith (3833) according to Maktaba Shamila. The arrangement of Hadiths are by subject matter. Most of Hadiths in Sunan are authentic, only few of Hadiths are weak (Dhaif).

Conveyance
Darimi transmitted these hadiths to `Isa ibn `Umar al-Samarqandi; date of death unknown, but presumably after 293 AH. Thereafter it passed to:
 `Abdullah ibn Ahmad ibn Hamawiya al-Sarkhasi (293–381 AH) 
 `Abd al-Rahman ibn Muhammad ibn Muzaffar al-Dawudi "Jamal al-Islam" (374–467 AH) 
 Abu'l-Waqt `Abd al-Awwal ibn `Isa ibn Shu`ayb al-Sijizzi (458–553 AH)

Published editions

 Edited by Husayn Salim Asad, Dar al-Maghni, 1420 AH / 2000 CE, p. 151-3
 al-Musnad al-Jami' - Sunan al-Darimi (المُسْنَد الجَامِع المعروف سُنَن الدَّارِمِي) Imam Abi Muhammad al-Darimi, Published: Mu'assassat al-Risalah | Beirut, Lebanon

See also
 List of Sunni books
 Kutub al-Sittah
 Sahih Muslim
 Jami al-Tirmidhi
 Sunan Abu Dawood
 Jami' at-Tirmidhi
 Either: Sunan ibn Majah, Muwatta Malik

References

9th-century Arabic books
10th-century Arabic books
Sunni literature
Hadith
Hadith collections
Sunni hadith collections